Archduchess Elisabeth Franziska Maria of Austria (17 January 1831 – 14 February 1903) was born in Ofen (Buda), Hungary, the daughter of Palatine Joseph of Hungary (1776–1847) and his third wife Maria Dorothea of Württemberg (1797–1855).

First marriage
Her first marriage, on 4 October 1847 in Vienna, was to her second cousin Archduke Ferdinand Karl Viktor of Austria-Este (1821–1849), by whom she had one daughter: 
 Archduchess Maria Theresia of Austria-Este (1849–1919), wife of King Ludwig III of Bavaria and Jacobite pretender to the thrones of England and Scotland.

Second marriage

Her second marriage, on 18 April 1854, in Vienna, was to her first cousin Archduke Karl Ferdinand of Austria (1818–1874) by whom she had six children:

 Archduke Franz Joseph of Austria (1855–1855)
 Archduke Friedrich of Austria, Duke of Teschen (1856–1936)
 Archduchess Maria Christina of Austria (1858–1929), Queen of Spain, wife of King Alfonso XII of Spain
 Archduke Charles Stephen of Austria (1860–1933)
 Archduke Eugen of Austria (1863–1954)
 Archduchess Maria Eleonora of Austria (1864–1864)

Elisabeth died at her son's palais, the Albertina, Vienna, of pneumonia. She is buried in Baden bei Wien, where there is a street named after her.

Ancestry

References

External links

Austrian princesses
House of Habsburg-Lorraine
Austria-Este
1831 births
1903 deaths
Elisabeth Franziska
Hungarian Roman Catholics
Nobility from Budapest
Deaths from pneumonia in Austria-Hungary